Alo Chhaya was an Indian Bengali television soap opera which premiered on 2 September 2019 as a replacement of the popular daily soap Joyee and aired on Bengali General Entertainment Channel Zee Bangla and all old episodes are also available on the digital platform ZEE5. The series was produced by Susanta Das under the banner of Tent Cinema. It starred Debadrita Basu, Oindrila Bose, and Arnab Banerjee in lead role. The show went off air on 9 April 2021 due to low trp ratings.

The story revolves around the life of an orphan girl named Alo, whose life gets intertwined with her maternal cousin Chhaya, since childhood. When Alo and Chhaya gets married into the same family, a new set of problems arise between the two.

Cast

Main
 Debadrita Basu as Alo Chatterjee Sengupta, Chhaya's elder cousin,  Akash's wife
 Hiya Dey as child Alo
 Oindrila Bose as Chhaya Adhikari Banerjee, Alo's younger cousin, Baban's wife (till his death), Deepjoy's wife
 Smriti Singh as child Chhaya
 Arnab Banerjee as Akash Sengupta, Alo's husband

Recurring
 Kushal Chakraborty as Alokendu Adhikari: Chhaya's father
 Bidipta Chakraborty as Maitreyee Adhikari: Chhaya's mother
 Anamika Saha as Kundalata Adhikari: Chhaya's Thammi
 Surojit Bandyopadhyay as Birendra Adhikari
 Aritra Dutta as Anish
 Diganta Bagchi as Sudhin
 Sayantani Sengupta as Tanushree
 Sudeshna Roy as Manjushree: Tanushree's mother
 Kanyakumari Mukherjee / Tanushree Goswami as Gayatri Chatterjee: Maitreyee's sister and Alo's mother
 Koushik Bhattacharya as Pabitra Chatterjee: Alo's father
 Satabdi Nag as Anushree: Tanushree's sister and Anish's lover
 Ipshita Mukherjee as Deepanwita: Akash's sister-in-law, Amit's wife and Deepjoy's sister
 Deepsheta Mitra / Alokananda Guha as Ruchiraa: Niloy's wife
 Dolon Roy as Alokananda Sengupta: Akash's mother
 Arindam Banerjee as Tirthankar Sengupta: Akash's father
 Abanti Dutta as Agnirupa Sengupta: Tirthankar's youngest sister, Akash's Pishimoni
 Saugata Bandyopadhyay as Niloy Sengupta: Akash's elder brother.
 Debika Mitra as Pritilata: Tirthankar and Agnirupa's mother, Akash's grandmother
 Shraboni Bonik as Jaya: Akash's aunt, Baban's mother, Chhaya's mother-in-law
 Elfina Mukherjee as Amropali Sengupta: Elinaa and Akash's elder sister, Sujoy's estranged wife
 Vivaan Ghosh as Amit Sengupta: Deepanwita's husband, Tirthankar-Alokananda's first child and Akaash, Niloy, Pali & Linaa's elder brother
 Nandini Dutta as Elinaa aka Linaa: Tirthankar and Alokananda's youngest daughter, Akaash's youngest sister
 Koushik Das as Pratik Sengupta aka Baban: Jaya's only child, Akaash's youngest brother and Chhaya's husband
 Sourya Bhattacharya as Deepu Adhikari: Chhaya and Alo's elder cousin
 Samriddho as child Deepu
 Soma Banerjee as Shashikala Devi: Deepjoy and Deepanwita's mother, Chhaya's mother-in-law
 Souvik Banerjee as Deepjoy Banerjee: Deepanwita's brother and Chhaya's second husband
 Ranit Modak as Sujoy Samaddar / Aniket Mitra: Amropali's husband, Baban's former friend
 Sonalisa Das as Bipasha Sanyal: Akaash's ex-fiancée

References

External links 

 Alo Chhaya at ZEE5
 

Zee Bangla original programming
2019 Indian television series debuts
Bengali-language television programming in India
2021 Indian television series endings